Susquehanna Township is a township in Dauphin County, Pennsylvania, United States. The population was 26,736 at the time of the 2020 census. This represents a 9.8% increase from the 2000 census count of 21,895. Susquehanna Township has the postal ZIP codes 17109 and 17110, which maintain the Harrisburg place name designation. The township is a suburb of Harrisburg and is connected to Marysville by the Rockville Bridge, the world's longest stone-arch rail bridge at the time of its completion.

History
Susquehanna Township is located adjacent to the city of Harrisburg in Dauphin County. It was named from the Susquehanna River which runs along its western edge.

On June 4, 1785, the state legislature created Dauphin County from part of Lancaster County. By that time, the territory of today's Dauphin County had been divided among the townships of Derry, Londonderry, Lower Paxtang and Upper Paxtang. The spelling "Paxtang" is from the original Indian name Peshtank, which meant "standing water" and further morphed into "Paxton." Susquehanna Township was incorporated from part of Lower Paxtang on May 1, 1815.

The first settlement where Susquehanna Township now lies was known as "Coxestown" and was laid out by Dr. John Cox Jr. of Philadelphia on October 2, 1757. In honor of his wife, Ester, the town was renamed "Estherton" and was the second oldest town in Dauphin County (behind Middletown). In 1774, a second settlement, "Rockville", and a third in 1815, "Progress" were settled. On January 2, 1952, Susquehanna became a First Class township via the Dauphin County Court.

The Rockville Bridge was listed on the National Register of Historic Places in 1975.

Geography
It is drained by the Susquehanna River, which separates it from Cumberland County and Perry County to the west.

The township's numbered roads include Interstate 81, U.S. Route 22, U.S. Route 322, and Pennsylvania Route 39. Other local roads include Elmerton Avenue and Progress Avenue.

Unincorporated communities and census designated places in Susquehanna Township
Beaufort Farms
Edgemont
Estherton
Lucknow
Montrose Park
Paxtang Manor
Progress CDP

Adjacent municipalities
Middle Paxton Township (north)
Lower Paxton Township (east)
Swatara Township (south)
Paxtang (south)
Harrisburg (southwest and west)
Penbrook (southwest)
East Pennsboro Township, Cumberland County (west)
Marysville, Perry County (northwest)

Demographics

As of the 2020 census, the township was 60.6% White, 27.3% Black or African American, 0.1% Native American, 5.6% Asian, and 3.7% were two or more races. 7.0% of the population were of Hispanic or Latino ancestry .

As of the census of 2020, there were 26,736 people, 10,529 households residing in the township. The population density was 2,004.2 people per square mile (773.84/km2). The racial makeup of the township was 60.6% White, 27.3% African American, 0.1% Native American, 5.6% Asian, 0.00% Pacific Islander, and 3.7% from two or more races. Hispanic or Latino of any race were 7.0% of the population.

The median income for a household in the township was $68,674. The per capita income for the township was $34,875. About 9.1% of the population was below the poverty line.

Neighborhoods 
Neighborhoods in Susquehanna Township include Edgemont, Oxford Court, Beaufort Farms, Mountaindale, Apple Creek Farms, Deer Path Woods, Northwoods Crossing, Sienna Woods, Saybrook Meadows, Latshmere, Green Acres, Crooked Hill, Montrose Park, Waverly Woods, Wedgewood Hills, Whitehall Terrace, Woodridge Estates, and Progress.

Attractions
 The National Civil War Museum is just inside the township boundary, though owned by the bordering municipality of the City of Harrisburg.
 Capital Area Greenbelt runs through the Township.

Politics and government

Legislators
State Representative Sue Helm, Republican, 104th district
State Senator John DiSanto, Republican, 15th district
US Representative Scott Perry, Republican, 10th district

Board of Commissioners
Susquehanna Township is a first-class township and elects nine commissioners by ward.

Other municipal positions

References

External links

Susquehanna Township official website

Townships in Dauphin County, Pennsylvania
Townships in Pennsylvania
Populated places established in 1815
1815 establishments in Pennsylvania